Maebongsan is a mountain of North Korea. It has an elevation of 197 metres. It stands in Pongchon County, South Hwanghae Province.

See also
List of mountains of Korea

References

Mountains of North Korea